Pishin District is a district (bakhsh) in Sarbaz County, Sistan and Baluchestan Province, Iran. At the 2006 census, its population (including portions later split off and joined to the Central District) was 29,580, in 5,562 families; excluding those portions, the population was 19,521, in 3,505 families.  The district has one city: Pishin. The district has one rural district (dehestan): Pishin Rural District.

References 

Sarbaz County
Districts of Sistan and Baluchestan Province